Bekir Sıtkı Bircan (1886 – 26 June 1967) was a Turkish footballer, high school teacher and one of the founders of Galatasaray SK. He spent the entirety of his career with his hometown club.

Honours
Galatasaray
 Istanbul Football League: 1908–09, 1909–10, 1910–11

References

 Tekil, Süleyman. Galatasaray Tarihi, 1905–1985, page (16). İstanbul: Galatasaray Spor Kulübü, 1986.
 Milliyet Newspaper Archive 27 June 1967

1880s births
1967 deaths
Footballers from Istanbul
Galatasaray S.K. footballers
Schoolteachers from Istanbul
Galatasaray High School alumni
Association football defenders
Turkish footballers